The 2017 Critérium du Dauphiné was a road cycling stage race that took place between 4 and 11 June 2017. It was the 69th edition of the Critérium du Dauphiné and was the twenty-third event of the 2017 UCI World Tour.

The race was won on the final day by Danish rider Jakob Fuglsang, riding for the  team. They were later caught before the final climb; Fuglsang and Martin went clear again on that climb, with Fuglsang later dropping Martin. Fuglsang remained clear to the finish, winning his second stage of the race by 12 seconds from Martin. Porte ultimately finished the stage in seventh place, 75 seconds behind Fuglsang; however, with bonus seconds in play on the race, Fuglsang's ten-second bonus gave him the race victory by ten seconds over Porte, a first for Denmark at the race. Martin finished third overall, as his six-second bonus allowed him to overtake Chris Froome by a single second.

In the race's other classifications,  rider Arnaud Démare won the points classification while  rider Koen Bouwman won the mountains classification having won the second and third stages respectively. 's Emanuel Buchmann won the young rider classification, while  won the teams classification.

Teams
As the Critérium du Dauphiné is a UCI World Tour event, all eighteen UCI WorldTeams were invited automatically and obliged to enter a team in the race. Four UCI Professional Continental teams competed, completing the 22-team peloton.

Route
The route of the 2017 Critérium du Dauphiné was announced on 16 March 2017.

Stages

Stage 1
4 June 2017 — Saint-Étienne to Saint-Étienne,

Stage 2
5 June 2017 — Saint-Chamond to Arlanc,

Stage 3
6 June 2017 — Le Chambon-sur-Lignon to Tullins,

Stage 4
7 June 2017 — La Tour-du-Pin to Bourgoin-Jallieu, individual time trial (ITT)

Stage 5
8 June 2017 — La Tour-de-Salvagny to Mâcon,

Stage 6
9 June 2017 — Parc des Oiseaux to La Motte-Servolex,

Stage 7
10 June 2017 — Aoste to Alpe d'Huez,

Stage 8
11 June 2017 — Albertville to Plateau de Solaison,

Classification leadership table
In the Critérium du Dauphiné, four different jerseys were awarded. The most important was the general classification, which was calculated by adding each cyclist's finishing times on each stage. Time bonuses were awarded to the first three finishers on all stages except for the individual time trial: the stage winner won a ten-second bonus, with six and four seconds for the second and third riders respectively. The rider with the least accumulated time is the race leader, identified by a yellow jersey with a blue bar; the winner of this classification was considered the winner of the race.

Additionally, there was a points classification, which awarded a green jersey. In the classification, cyclists received points for finishing in the top 10 in a stage. More points were awarded on the flatter stages in the opening half of the race.

There was also a mountains classification, the leadership of which was marked by a red jersey with white polka dots. In the mountains classification, points towards the classification were won by reaching the top of a climb before other cyclists. Each climb was categorised as either hors, first, second, third, or fourth-category, with more points available for the higher-categorised climbs. Hors-category climbs awarded the most points; the first ten riders were able to accrue points, compared with the first six on first-category climbs, the first four on second-category, the first two on third-category and only the first for fourth-category.

The fourth jersey represented the young rider classification, marked by a white jersey. This was decided the same way as the general classification, but only riders born on or after 1 January 1992 were eligible to be ranked in the classification. There was also a team classification, in which the times of the best three cyclists per team on each stage were added together; the leading team at the end of the race was the team with the lowest total time.

Notes

References

External links

2017
2017 UCI World Tour
2017 in French sport
June 2017 sports events in France